The 1002nd Ruse is a 1915 Russian comedy film directed by Yevgeny Bauer.

Plot 
The film is set in 1915 Russia. A wife is cheating on her husband while he is fallen asleep after she gave him intoxicating drink. Suddenly the husband wakes up, but his wife tricks him and hides her lover in her closet. While the husband is trying to find out what happened his wife trick him with another ruse...

Cast 
 Lina Bauer as The Cunning Wife
 S. Rassatov as The Husband
 Sergei Kvasnitsky as Wife's Lover

References

External links 
 

1915 films
1910s Russian-language films
Russian comedy films